Léopold Demers (14 August 1912 – 21 November 1990) was a Liberal party member of the House of Commons of Canada. He was an agrologist by career.

He was first elected at the Laval—Two Mountains riding in a 20 December 1948 by-election. In the 1949 federal election, he was re-elected at Laval then re-elected for successive terms in 1953 and 1957. Demers was defeated in the 1958 election by Rodrigue Bourdages of the Progressive Conservative party.

External links
 

1912 births
1990 deaths
French Quebecers
Liberal Party of Canada MPs
Members of the House of Commons of Canada from Quebec
Politicians from Quebec City